The hellbender (Cryptobranchus alleganiensis), also known as the hellbender salamander, is a species of aquatic giant salamander endemic to the eastern and central United States. It is the largest salamander in North America. A member of the family Cryptobranchidae, the hellbender is the only extant member of the genus Cryptobranchus. Other closely related salamanders in the same family are in the genus Andrias, which contains the Japanese and Chinese giant salamanders. The hellbender, which is much larger than all other salamanders in its geographic range, employs an unusual means of respiration (which involves cutaneous gas exchange through capillaries found in its dorsoventral skin folds), and fills a particular niche—both as a predator and prey—in its ecosystem, which either it or its ancestors have occupied for around 65 million years. The species is listed as Vulnerable on the IUCN Red List of Threatened Species.

Etymology
The origin of the name "hellbender" is unclear. The Missouri Department of Conservation says:
The name 'hellbender' probably comes from the animal's odd look. One theory claims the hellbender was named by settlers who thought "it was a creature from hell where it's bent on returning." Another rendition says the undulating skin of a hellbender reminded observers of "horrible tortures of the infernal regions." In reality, it's a harmless aquatic salamander.

In a study conducted in Indiana, informing the public about the rarity and locality of the hellbender resulted in more positive attitudes toward this species than were previously held.  Other vernacular names include snot otter, lasagna lizard, devil dog, mud-devil, mud dog, water dog, grampus, Allegheny alligator, and leverian water newt.

The subspecific name bishopi is in honor of American herpetologist Sherman C. Bishop.

Description
C. alleganiensis has a flat body and head, with beady dorsal eyes and slimy skin. Like most salamanders, it has short legs with four toes on the front legs and five on its back limbs, and its tail is keeled for propulsion. Their tail is shaped like a rudder, but it is rarely used for swimming; these salamanders use pads on their toes instead to grip rocks and walk up and down streams instead of swimming. The hellbender has working lungs, but gill slits are often retained, although only immature specimens have true gills; the hellbender absorbs oxygen from the water through capillaries of its side frills. Only occasionally leaving the water, the hellbender makes little use of these lungs and the juveniles lose their external gills after around 18 months  Hellbenders use their lungs for buoyancy more than breathing. It is blotchy brown or red-brown in color, with a paler underbelly.

An adult weighs , making them the fifth heaviest living amphibian in the world after their South China, Chinese and Japanese cousins and the goliath frog, while the largest cane toads may also weigh as much as a hellbender. Hellbenders reach sexual maturity at about five years of age, and may live 30 years in captivity.

The hellbender has a few characteristics that make it distinguishable from other native salamanders, including a gigantic, dorsoventrally flattened body with thick folds travelling down the sides, a single open gill slit on each side, and hind feet with five toes each. Easily distinguished from most other endemic salamander species simply by their size, hellbenders average up to 60 cm or about 2 ft in length; the only species requiring further distinction (due to an overlap in distribution and size range) is the common mudpuppy (Necturus maculosus). This demarcation can be made by noting the presence of external gills in the mudpuppy, which are lacking in the hellbender, as well as the presence of four toes on each hind foot of the mudpuppy (in contrast with the hellbender's five).

Taxonomy
The genus Cryptobranchus has historically only been considered to contain one species, C. alleganiensis, with two subspecies, C. a. alleganiensis and C. a. bishopi. A recent decline in population size of the Ozark subspecies C. a. bishopi has led to further research into populations of this subspecies, including genetic analysis to determine the best method for conservation.
Crowhurst et al., for instance, found that the "Ozark subspecies" denomination is insufficient for describing genetic (and therefore evolutionary) divergence within the genus Cryptobranchus in the Ozark region. They found three equally divergent genetic units within the genus: C. a. alleganiensis, and two distinct eastern and western populations of C. a.  bishopi. These three groups were shown to be isolated, and are considered to most likely be "diverging on different evolutionary paths".

Distribution
Hellbenders are present in a number of Eastern US states, from southern New York to northern Georgia, including parts of Ohio, Pennsylvania, Maryland, West Virginia, Virginia, Kentucky, Illinois, Indiana, Tennessee, North Carolina, South Carolina, Alabama, Mississippi, Arkansas, Missouri, and extending into Oklahoma and Kansas. The subspecies (or species, depending on the source) C. a. bishopi is confined to the Ozarks of northern Arkansas and southern Missouri, while C. a. alleganiensis is found in the rest of these states.

Some hellbender populations—namely a few in Missouri, Pennsylvania, and Tennessee—have historically been noted to be quite abundant, but several man-made threats have converged on the species such that it has seen a serious population decline throughout its range. In Missouri, it is estimated that the populations have declined by 77% since the 1980's. Hellbender populations were listed in 1981 as already extinct or endangered in Illinois, Indiana, Iowa, and Maryland, decreasing in Arkansas and Kentucky, and generally threatened as a species throughout their range by various human activities and developments.

Ecology
The hellbender salamander, considered a "habitat specialist", has adapted to fill a specific niche within a very specific environment, and is labeled as such "because its success is dependent on a constancy of dissolved oxygen, temperature and flow found in swift water areas", which in turn limits it to a narrow spectrum of stream/river choices. As a result of this specialization, hellbenders are generally found in areas with large, irregularly shaped, and intermittent rocks and swiftly moving water, while they tend to avoid wider, slow-moving waters with muddy banks and/or slab rock bottoms. This specialization likely contributed to the decline in their populations, as collectors could easily identify their specific habitats. One collector noted, at one time, "one could find a specimen under almost every suitable rock", but after years of collecting, the population had declined significantly. The same collector noted, he "never found two specimens under the same rock", corroborating the account given by other researchers that hellbenders are generally solitary; they are thought to gather only during the mating season. On average, their home range is estimated to be 198 square meters as of 2005. 

Both subspecies, C. a. alleganiensis and C. a. bishopi undergo a metamorphosis after around a year and a half of life. Until then, they are easily confused with mudpuppies, and can be differentiated often only through toe number. After this metamorphosis, hellbenders must be able to absorb oxygen through the folds in their skin, which is largely behind the need for fast-moving, oxygenated water. If a hellbender ends up in an area of slow-moving water, not enough of it will pass over its skin in a given time, making it difficult to garner enough oxygen to support necessary respiratory functions. A below-favorable oxygen content can make life equally difficult.

Hellbenders are preyed upon by diverse predators, including various fish and reptiles (including both snakes and turtles). Cannibalism of eggs is also considered a common occurrence.

Life history and behavior

Behavior
Once a hellbender finds a favorable location, it generally does not stray too far from it—except occasionally for breeding and hunting—and will protect it from other hellbenders both in and out of the breeding season. While the range of two hellbenders may overlap, they are noted as rarely being present in the overlapping area when the other salamander is in the area. The species is at least somewhat nocturnal, with peak activity being reported by one source as occurring around "two hours after dark" and again at dawn (although the dawn peak was recorded in the lab and could be misleading as a result). Nocturnal activity has been found to be most prevalent in early summer, perhaps coinciding with highest water depths.

Diet
C. alleganiensis feeds primarily on crayfish and small fish, but also insects, worms, molluscs, tadpoles and smaller salamanders. A study conducted in 2017 found that larval hellbenders eat mayfly and caddisfly nymphs. One report, written by a commercial collector in the 1940s, noted a trend of more crayfish predation in the summer during times of higher prey activity, whereas fish made up a larger part of the winter diet, when crayfish are less active. Cannibalism—mainly on eggs—has been known to occur within hellbender populations. One researcher claimed perhaps density is maintained, and density dependence in turn created, in part by intraspecific predation.

Reproduction
The hellbenders' breeding season begins in late August or early- to mid-September and can continue as late as the end of November, depending on region. They exhibit no sexual dimorphism, except during the fall mating season, when males have a bulging ring around their cloacal glands. Unlike most salamanders, the hellbender performs external fertilization. Before mating, each male excavates a brood site, a saucer-shaped depression under a rock or log, with its entrance positioned out of the direct current, usually pointing downstream. The male remains in the brood site awaiting a female. When a female approaches, the male guides or drives her into his burrow and prevents her from leaving until she oviposits.

As the female lays eggs, the male positions himself alongside or slightly above them, spraying the eggs with sperm while swaying his tail and moving his hind limbs, which disperses the sperm uniformly. The male often tempts other females to lay eggs in his nest, and as many as 1,946 eggs have been counted in a single nest. Males also exhibit mate and shelter guarding. Studies have found that until the female successfully reproduces, the male hellbender will guard her in his territory until the reproduction is complete. Cannibalism, however, leads to a much lower number of eggs in hellbender nests than would be predicted by egg counts.

After oviposition, the male drives the female away from the nest and guards the eggs. Incubating males rock back and forth and undulate their lateral skin folds, which circulates the water, increasing oxygen supply to both eggs and adult. Incubation lasts from 45 to 75 days, depending on region.

Adaptations
Hellbenders are superbly adapted to the shallow, fast-flowing, rocky streams in which they live. Their flattened shape offers little resistance to the flowing water, allowing them to work their way upstream and also to crawl into narrow spaces under rocks. The wrinkles and fold along their skin is used in aid to expand surface area for cutaneous respiration. Although their eyesight is relatively poor, they have light-sensitive cells all over their bodies. Those on their tails are especially finely tuned and may help them position safely under rocks without their tails poking out to give themselves away. They have a good sense of smell and move upstream in search of food such as dead fish, following the trail of scent molecules. Smell is possibly their most important sense when hunting. They also have a lateral line similar to those of fish, with which they can detect vibrations in the water.

Conservation status
Research throughout the range of the hellbender has shown a dramatic decline in populations in the majority of locations. As of 2022, the species is classified as Vulnerable by the IUCN. Many different anthropogenic sources have helped to create this decline, including the siltation and sedimentation, blocking of dispersal/migration routes, and destruction of riverine habitats created by dams and other development, as well as pollution, disease and overharvesting for commercial and scientific purposes. As many of these detrimental effects have irreversibly damaged hellbender populations, it is important to conserve the remaining populations through protecting habitats and—perhaps in places where the species was once endemic and has been extirpated—by augmenting numbers through reintroduction.

Due to sharp decreases seen in the Ozark subspecies, researchers have been trying to differentiate C. a. alleganiensis and C. a. bishopi into two management units. Indeed, researchers found significant genetic divergence between the two groups, as well as between them and another isolated population of C. a. alleganiensis. This could be reason enough to ensure work is done on both subspecies, as preserving extant genetic diversity is of crucial ecological importance.

The Ozark hellbender has been listed as an endangered species under the Endangered Species Act by the US Fish and Wildlife Service since October 5, 2011. This hellbender subspecies inhabits the White River and Spring River systems in southern Missouri and northern Arkansas, and its population has declined an estimated 75% since the 1980s, with only about 590 individuals remaining in the wild. Degraded water quality, habitat loss resulting from impoundments, ore and gravel mining, sedimentation, and collection for the pet trade are thought to be the main factors resulting in the amphibian's decline. When chytridiomycosis killed 75% of the St. Louis Zoo's captive hellbender population between March 2006 and April 2007, tests began to be conducted on wild populations.  The disease has been detected in all Missouri populations of the Ozark hellbender. NatureServe treats C. a. alleganiensis as an Imperiled Subspecies, C. a. bishopi as a Critically Imperiled Subspecies, and the species as a whole as Vulnerable.

The Ozark hellbender was successfully bred in captivity for the first time at the St. Louis Zoo, in a joint project with the Missouri Department of Conservation, hatching on November 15, 2011.

Apart from the Ozark efforts, head-starting programs, in which eggs are collected from the wild and raised in captivity for re-release at a less vulnerable stage, have been initiated in New York and Ohio.

Members of the Pennsylvania State Senate have voted to approve the eastern hellbender as the official state amphibian in an effort to raise awareness about its endangered status. The legislation has been mired in controversy due to a dispute by House members who argue that Wehrle's salamander should be given the honor. The legislation did not pass in 2018, but was reintroduced in 2019. On April 23, 2019, Pennsylvania Governor Tom Wolf signed legislation making the eastern hellbender Pennsylvania's official state amphibian. Youth members of the Chesapeake Bay Foundation's Pennsylvania Student Leadership Council were heavily involved writing and advocating on behalf of this legislation. They hope that the success of the hellbender bill in the Pennsylvania Senate will contribute to clean water efforts and raise awareness for the hellbender's struggling population.

See also

 Necturus maculosus (Common mudpuppy)
 Necturus alabamensis (Alabama waterdog)
 Necturus beyeri (Gulf coast waterdog)

References

Further reading
 Bishop SC (1943). Handbook of Salamanders: The Salamanders of the United States, and of Lower California. Ithaca and London: Comstock Publishing Associates, a division of Cornell University Press. 508 pp. (Cryptobranchus allegheniensis, pp. 59–62; C. bishopi, p. 63).
 Grobman AB (1943). "Notes on Salamanders with the Description of a New Species of Cryptobranchus ". Occ. Pap. Mus. Zool. Univ. Michigan (470): 1-13. (Cryptobranchus bishopi, new species).
 Petranka, James W. (1998). Salamanders of the United States and Canada. Washington and London: Smithsonian Institution Press.

External links

 Hellbender Cryptobranchus alleganiensis field guide from the Missouri Department of Conservation
 Eastern hellbender information at Commonwealth of Virginia.
 Eastern Hellbender Fact Sheet at New York State.
 Cryptobranchus  at CalPhotos.

Amphibians of the United States
Endemic fauna of the United States
Amphibians described in 1803
Cryptobranchidae
Extant Gelasian first appearances
Natural history of the Great Smoky Mountains
Taxa named by François Marie Daudin
Symbols of Pennsylvania